Donald Voorhees (July 26, 1903– January 10, 1989) was an American composer and conductor who received an Emmy Award nomination for "Individual Achievements in Music" for his work on the television series,  The Bell Telephone Hour.

Career
Starting in 1926, Voorhees' orchestra recorded prolifically for Columbia, Edison, Pathe, Perfect, Cameo, and Hit of the Week, playing the piano in early recordings. His recording career mostly ended in 1931, when he approached the bigger opportunities radio offered at the time. His first broadcast work was NBC's The Texaco Fire Chief Show, which starred comedian Ed Wynn. Other of the programs he worked for was the Maxwell House Showboat, appearing in a 1933 "picturization", the short Captain Henry's Show Boat.

From 1935 to 1941, and from 1949 to 1953 (with Ardon Cornwell), Voorhees was the musical director and conductor for the radio and television show, Cavalcade of America.

Voorhees also served as conductor of the Bell Telephone Hour orchestra for 26 years, from its first broadcasts on radio in 1942 until its final television episode in 1968. He was nominated for an Emmy Award in 1966 for "Individual Achievements in Music" for his work on the series.

He was also the first conductor of the Allentown Symphony Orchestra.  Voorhees served as conductor and musical director of the orchestra from its inception in 1951 until 1983.

A resident of Stone Harbor, New Jersey, Voorhees died of pneumonia at the age of 85 on January 10, 1989, in Cape May Court House, New Jersey.

References

External links

1903 births
1989 deaths
American people of Dutch descent
American male conductors (music)
Musicians from Allentown, Pennsylvania
20th-century American conductors (music)
People from Stone Harbor, New Jersey
Deaths from pneumonia in New Jersey
Classical musicians from Pennsylvania
20th-century American male musicians
William Allen High School alumni